The Building at 813–815 Forest Avenue is a historic apartment building in Evanston, Illinois. The three-story brick building was built in 1929. The building has an L-shaped layout with a half courtyard, a relatively common pattern among Evanston's apartments. Architect Jens J. Jensen designed the building in the Tudor Revival style, a popular choice for the time. The building's design includes Tudor arched entrances, lancet windows, projecting bays, and a crenellated tower.

The building was added to the National Register of Historic Places on March 15, 1984.

References

Buildings and structures on the National Register of Historic Places in Cook County, Illinois
Residential buildings on the National Register of Historic Places in Illinois
Buildings and structures in Evanston, Illinois
Apartment buildings in Illinois
Tudor Revival architecture in Illinois
Residential buildings completed in 1929